Purdue Improved Crop Storage (PICS) bags (formerly Purdue Improved Cowpea Storage bags) provide a simple, low-cost method of reducing post-harvest cowpea (Vigna unguiculata) losses due to bruchid infestations in west and central Africa. Bags have been demonstrated to be effective for many other crops.  

A PICS bag consists of two layers of polyethylene liners and a third layer made from woven polypropylene. When each layer is tied and closed separately, it creates a hermetically sealed environment for storing harvested grain. This oxygen-deprived environment proves fatal for Bruchidius atrolineatus and Callosobruchus maculatus and other postharvest insects.

The problem
Insect pests pose a main threat to the shelf-life of stored grain. Species like Bruchidius atrolineatus and Callosobruchus maculatus, (commonly known as cowpea weevils, or bruchids) carry out their life cycle within grain, and their presence makes the crop unfit for human or animal consumption. These insects reproduce rapidly, thus only a few of the insects within a collection of cowpeas can cause significant damage within a month.

Cowpea is an extremely important crop to Western and Central African countries. Not only are cowpeas highly nutritious for humans, but they are also a source of fodder for animals, and are regularly used by rural women to generate their own income, thus providing an important source of liquidity for farmers.

History
In 1987, Professor Larry Murdock of Purdue University, in partnership with Bean/Cowpea CRSP, USAID, and BIFAD, led a team of researchers working to combat bruchid infestations of cowpea harvests in Cameroon. The outcome of this initiative were PICS bags.

Since 2007, more than 1.75 million PICS bags have been sold in West and Central Africa and demonstrations of their effectiveness have been conducted in 31,000 villages. Currently, this project is funded with $11.4 million (USD) by the Bill and Melinda Gates Foundation.

Project objectives
The PICS project has evolved since its original conception. As such, the project's target objectives have also evolved to meet the needs of its mission of delivering safe, cheap, and effective postharvest storage solutions to smallholder farmers.

PICS 1

The specific objectives of this project involve determining the optimal design for a triple-layer, hermetically sealed, commercially available cowpea storage bag. Another goal is to increase the knowledge of farmers and rural-development groups on non-chemical cowpea storage methods, and to demonstrate the most effective cowpea storage methods for these groups. It is also important to the project to develop a local supply chain for PICS bags that makes the technology available to rural farmers, as well as providing development opportunities for local businesses.

PICS 2

The second phase sought to expand the original scope of the PICS program. In this second phase, called PICS 2, the program sought to 1) identify agricultural commodities or other food products that suffer losses to insects during storage, 2) test the PICS bags through collaborative projects with scientists in developing nations, primarily sub-Saharan Africa, 3) Implement economic analyses to estimate the potential benefits if the PICS technology were optimized and adopted for a specific commodity, 4) Develop plans to disseminate the technologies for those commodities and communities where it would be most effective and provide the greatest benefit. This phase of the program ran from January 1, 2014 until Jun 30, 2014.

PICS 3

The third phase of the program began in April 2014 and is currently ongoing. PICS 3 seeks to improve market access, cash incomes, and food security among smallholder farmers in Sub-Saharan Africa by reducing post-harvest storage losses through expansion of the PICS bag technology.

Geography

This project was first developed in Cameroon, but it has since spread to twenty-three nations in Africa and Asia. To date, PICS bags have been introduced and are in use in the following nations: Afghanistan, Benin, Burkina Faso, Burundi, Cameroon, Chad, the Democratic Republic of the Congo, Ethiopia, Ghana, India, Kenya, Malawi, Mali, Mozambique, Niger, Nigeria, Rwanda, Senegal, Tanzania, Togo, Uganda, and Zambia.

Use
After harvesting and thoroughly drying the grain, farmers place grain into a polyethylene bag capable of holding either 50 kg or 100 kg. The bag is then tightly sealed, preventing air from entering. The first polyethylene bag is surrounded by a second identical bag, which is also sealed, making it airtight. The double-bagged grain is then sealed inside a third woven polypropylene bag, which provides the mechanical strength for PICS bags.

This method of triple bagging creates an airtight environment, and seals any insects present in the crop inside the bag. These insects briefly continue to consume oxygen, but as oxygen levels in the bags drop, and CO2 concentrations rise, the insects stop feeding and quickly die, thereby protecting the crop from further damage.

Recent studies have shown that bruchids sealed in PICS bags do not die from asphyxiation, but rather from thirst. This subfamily of Chrysomelidae has the ability to produce water through their own metabolism. This process requires oxygen, so when oxygen levels in PICS bags decrease the bruchids lose the ability to produce water and die of dehydration. It is reasonable to assume that this same adaptation exists in other postharvest insects.

Advantages

PICS bags provide many benefits to smallholder farmers. Not only is this an effective insecticide-free, low-cost method of storing cowpeas and other grain, but it is easy to explain to farmers, and PICS bags can be stored in family homes– making this an effective way for smallholder farmers to protect their harvests.

In addition, the bags can be opened at any time – when they are unsealed the cowpeas are ready to be consumed. The PICS bags can then be reused, provided they are free of holes and tears. Studies have demonstrated that PICS can be used multiple times across several years without any loss in quality.

Storing grain until it reaches a high market value allows farmers to gain greater profits, and storage provides communities with food reserves during the post-harvest season. Even after several months of storage in PICS bags, the quality of the grain does not decline.

Economic development

The PICS project aims to increase the incomes of smallholder producers. Each household that adopts the use of PICS bags is expected to save $150 (USD) annually. With widespread adoption of PICS bags, global savings of cowpea harvests are predicted to be worth half a billion US dollars annually.

The additional income provided through the use of PICS bags will allow smallholder producers to invest in their own farming practices and local communities, thereby encouraging local development.

Disadvantages

Some problems with this technology are that PICS bags are prone to theft, and therefore need to be protected. In areas where grain has always been sold immediately after harvest, storage areas may not exist for PICS bags. Therefore, the bags' introduction to some communities may also require the construction of new storage facilities. In addition, it is essential that grain intended to be stored in PICS bags be thoroughly dried prior to storage in order to prevent mould growth and grain rot. And while PICS bags protect cowpeas against damage caused by insects, they do not provide a barrier against mice, rats, or other animals. Finally, the environmental impact of PICS bags remains largely unstudied, and should be seriously considered.

Practical information

In order to increase the effectiveness of PICS bag technology, the following suggestions should be considered:

As studies show, PICS bags work not only by depriving bruchids of oxygen, but also by dehydrating their environment. Therefore, this technology could be improved by finding additional methods of quickly lowering the moisture content within sealed bags.
Since PICS bags do not provide protection from mice, rats, or other animals, any NGO aiming to increase their use should ensure that farmers are taught to keep their stored cowpea harvest in an environment free of these exterior threats. There is potential for PICS bags to be improved through the use of an additional barrier that cannot be punctured by animals.
Due to low levels of local literacy, this project aims to communicate PICS bag technology to communities through verbal demonstrations and also through information communicated via radio. In order to ensure full community participation in effective cowpea storage, women, men, and children must all participate in PICS bag demonstrations.

Solutions competing with PICS bags to prevent insect-induced post-harvest grain losses are other forms of hermetically sealed containers, such as the GrainPro bag. A similar method of protecting the crop is to store grain inside sealed steel drums.
Furthermore, the same basic principles of disabling insects within hermetically stored containers could potentially be applied to other crops in the region.

References

Baoua, I. B., V. Margam, L. Amadou, and L. L. Murdock. "Performance of Triple Bagging Hermetic Technology for Postharvest Storage of Cowpea Grain in Niger." Journal of Stored Products Research 51 (2012): 81-85. 31 July 2012. Web. 19 Nov. 2013. 
Baributsa, D., I. Baoua, J. Lowenberg-DeBoer, T. Abdoulaye, and L. L. Murdock. Purdue Improved Cowpea Storage (PICS) Technology. Rep. 262nd ed. Vol. E. West Lafayette: Purdue University, 2013. Department of Entomology. Oct. 2013. Web. 19 Nov. 2013. 
Coulibaly, J., S. D’Alessandro, T. Nouhoheflin, C. Aitchedji, M. Damisa, D. Baributsa, and J. Lowenberg-DeBoer. Purdue Improved Cowpea Storage (PICS) Supply Chain Study. Working paper. 4th ed. Vol. 12. West Lafayette: Purdue University, 2012. Print. 
"Hermetic Bags save African Crop, but Not How Experts Once Thought." University News Service. Purdue University, 21 Feb. 2012. Web. 18 Nov. 2013. 
"Project Overview." Purdue Improved Crop Storage. Purdue University, 2010. Web. 18 Nov. 2013. 
Purdue Improved Cowpea Storage - Technician Training Manual. Rep. Purdue Improved Cowpea Storage Project, 2008. Web. 18 Nov. 2013.

Food storage containers
Bags